Dolicharthria punctalis, the long-legged china-mark, is a species of moth of the family Crambidae. It is the type species of the proposed genus Stenia, which is usually included in Dolicharthria but may be distinct.

It is found mainly in central and southern Europe, but has been recorded further north. The wingspan is 20–25 mm. The moth flies from May to September depending on the location.

The caterpillars feed on Centaurea (knapweeds), Plantago (plantain herb), Trifolium (clovers), Artemisia vulgaris (common wormwood) and even the marine eelgrass Zostera marina. Yet other unusual recorded foods are dry leaves, plant waste, and old roots.

Footnotes

References

  (1942): Eigenartige Geschmacksrichtungen bei Kleinschmetterlingsraupen ["Strange tastes among micromoth caterpillars"]. Zeitschrift des Wiener Entomologen-Vereins 27: 105-109.  PDF fulltext
  (2009): Lepidoptera and Some Other Life Forms – Dolicharthria. Version of May 16, 2009. Retrieved April 12, 2010.

External links
 UKMoths

Spilomelinae
Moths described in 1775
Moths of Europe